Leena Lander (born 25 October 1955, in Turku) is a Finnish author. She grew up in Turku, in a boys' home that her father ran. In 1992, she won the Thanks for the Book Award for Tummien perhosten koti (The Home of the Dark Butterflies), which was made into a successful Finnish film in 2008. Her work is known for its concern with the treatment of children and tensions involving authority and conscience. She also won the Pro Finlandia medal of the Order of the Lion of Finland in 2000.

References

External links 

 IMDB page

1955 births
Living people
People from Turku
Writers from Southwest Finland
Finnish women novelists
20th-century Finnish novelists
21st-century Finnish novelists
20th-century Finnish women writers
21st-century Finnish women writers